Perry County Airport may refer to:

 Perry County Airport (Ohio) in Perry County, Ohio, United States (FAA: I86)
 James Tucker Airport in Perry County, Tennessee, United States (FAA: M15)
 Perry County Municipal Airport in Perry County, Indiana, United States (FAA: TEL)
 Richton-Perry County Airport in Perry County, Mississippi, Indiana, United States (FAA: M59)

See also 
 Perry Airport (disambiguation)
 Perry Municipal Airport (disambiguation)